Alexeyevskaya is a rural locality (a stanitsa) and the administrative center of Alexeyevsky District in Volgograd Oblast, Russia. Population:

References

Rural localities in Alexeyevsky District, Volgograd Oblast